Humes Bradley Galbraith (December 23, 1883 – August 13, 1947) was an American football coach. He served as the sixth head football coach at the University of Arizona, coaching for two seasons, 1908 and 1909, and compiling a record of 5–2.

Head coaching record

References

External links
 

1883 births
1947 deaths
Arizona Wildcats football coaches
Carlisle Indians football coaches
Susquehanna University alumni
Sportspeople from Altoona, Pennsylvania